was a Japanese musician and composer, born in Kitakyushu, Fukuoka. As a musician, he played keyboards in a number of bands, including Ryudo Uzaki's Ryūdōgumi. As a composer for film, television, and anime, he won awards of excellence at the Japan Academy Prize for his film scores for Rampo and Kin'yu Fushoku Rettō: Jubaku. He was also nominated for best original film score for the Taiwanese film Rice Rhapsody at the Golden Horse Awards.

He died of liver cancer at the age of 56 on 4 May 2006 in Inage-ku, Chiba.

Partial filmography
 Kozure Ôkami: Sono chîsaki te ni (1993)
 Rampo (1994)
 Kamikaze Taxi (1995)
 Kin'yu Fushoku Rettō: Jubaku (1999)
 Off-Balance (2001)
 Rice Rhapsody (2004)

References

External links

Kawasaki Masahiro at the TV Drama Database 

1949 births
2006 deaths
20th-century Japanese composers
20th-century Japanese male musicians
Deaths from cancer in Japan
Deaths from liver cancer
Japanese film score composers
Japanese male film score composers
Japanese television composers
Male television composers
Musicians from Fukuoka Prefecture
People from Kitakyushu